The 1993 Midwestern Collegiate Conference men's basketball tournament (now known as the Horizon League men's basketball tournament) was held March 11–13 at Market Square Arena in Indianapolis, Indiana.

Evansville defeated Xavier in the championship game, 80–69, to win their second straight (3rd overall) MCC/Horizon League men's basketball tournament title.

The Purple Aces received an automatic bid to the 1993 NCAA tournament as the #14 seed in the Southeast region. Xavier, the regular season conference co-champions, received an at-large bid as the #9 seed in the Midwest region.

Format
All eight conference members participated in the tournament and were seeded based on regular season conference records.

Bracket

References

Horizon League men's basketball tournament
Tournament
Midwestern City Conference men's basketball tournament
Midwestern City Conference men's basketball tournament